Pterocarpin is a pterocarpan found in the Fabaceae species Baphia nitida, Ononis viscosa subsp. breviflora, Pterocarpus spp., Sophora angustifolia, Sophora substrata and Swartzia madagascariensis.

See also 
 Homopterocarpin

References 

Pterocarpans